Wilson José Witzel  (born 19 February 1968) is a Brazilian politician and lawyer who was the 63rd Governor of the state of Rio de Janeiro. A member of the Social Christian Party, Witzel is a former federal judge and is an ex-marine. On 28 October 2018, he was elected Governor of the State of Rio de Janeiro with a four-year term beginning in January 2019, replacing Luiz Fernando Pezão, until his impeachment in April 2021.

Witzel holds a master's in Civil Law, and has been a professor of Criminal Law for more than 20 years. As a federal judge, he served in different civil and criminal courts in Rio de Janeiro and in Vitória (Espírito Santo).

Life and career 
Witzel was born in 1968 in Jundiaí. He spent 17 years acting in civil and criminal courts. He was a tenured federal judge of the 6th Federal Civil Court until 2 March 2018, when he resigned to join the (PSC).

He officially announced his candidacy for the position of Governor of the State of Rio de Janeiro on 21 July 2018. His deputy was Rio de Janeiro city councilor Cláudio Castro, also of the PSC.

In the first survey, Wilson Witzel polled just 1% of voting intentions, tied with André Monteiro (PRTB), Dayse Oliveira (PSTU) and Marcelo Trindade (NOVO), and was only ahead of Luiz Eugênio Honorato (PCO). He was behind Romário (PODE), Eduardo Paes (DEM), Anthony Garotinho(PRP), Tarcisio Motta (PSOL), Indio da Costa (PSD), Pedro Fernandes (PDT) and Marcia Tiburi (PT).

The last poll before the first round put him at 17% of valid votes, still behind Eduardo Paes, who had 27%, and tied with Romario. This was considered surprising because Witzel was a relative unknown in the state and had only 27 seconds of electoral advertising time. Many commentators attributed his popularity to his early endorsement of Jair Bolsonaro PSL.

On 7 October 2018, in the first round of the general elections in Brazil, Wilson Witzel received 41.28% of the valid votes (3,154,771 votes), coming in first; second was Eduardo Paes, of the DEM, former mayor of Rio de Janeiro, with 19.56% valid votes (1,494,831 votes); Tarcísio Motta came third with 10.72% of valid votes. Witzel and Paes advanced to the second round. The result was considered a surprise given Witzel's low standing in the early polls.

In the second round of the elections, Wilson Witzel received support from the candidate of the (PRTB) André Monteiro, the (PR) (Brazil), for which federal deputy Marcelo Delaroli had been candidate for vice-governor in Romário's campaign (PODE), from the PSD, which is the party of the defeated candidate Indio da Costa, who at first remained neutral  saying that he did not support Wilson Witzel, but few days later decided to declare his support for the candidate, and from Pedro Fernandes, the (PDT) candidate, who defied his party's decision to support Eduardo Paes (DEM) 

On 28 October 2018, in the second round of the general elections in Brazil, Witzel obtained 59.87% of the valid votes (4,675,355 votes), was thus elected Governor of the State of Rio de Janeiro for a term of 4 years starting January 2019; his opponent, Eduardo Paes, from DEM, received 40.13% of the valid votes (3,134,400 votes).

An ally of president Jair Bolsonaro, Witzel was elected after promising a "slaughter" of drug gangsters. Wilson Witzel officially took office as governor on 1 January 2019. However, because Jair Bolsonaro took office as president of Brazil on the same day, Witzel's ceremony was postponed to 2 January 2019. For his ceremony, Witzel had a special "governor's sash" made to be handed over to him by then-acting governor Francisco Dornelles. The practice, however, isn't official in the state of Rio de Janeiro, and wasn't tradition in the state's ceremonies.

In September 2019, following the killing of an eight-year-old girl, hundreds demonstrated in anger in the Complexo do Alemão favela where she was shot, and the hashtag "#aculpaedowitzel" led trending topics in Brazil. Cartoons showing the smiling governor wiping blood from his face.

On 14 April 2020, Witzel tested positive for COVID-19. An impeachment process has been opened against Witzel on 11 June 2020 related to corruption charges on misappropriating coronavirus funds.

On 28 August 2020, the Superior Court of Justice suspended Witzel from his powers and duties due to an investigation involving frauds in the acquisition of supplies during the COVID-19 pandemic.

References

Governors of Rio de Janeiro (state)
1968 births
People from Jundiaí
Fluminense Federal University alumni
20th-century Brazilian lawyers
21st-century Brazilian judges
Social Christian Party (Brazil) politicians
Brazilian people of German descent
Living people
Impeached governors removed from office
Impeached Brazilian officials